Futurex LP, commonly referred to as Futurex, is a privately held Texas-based information technology company specialized in cryptography.

Futurex provides data encryption solutions for financial institutions, retailers, and terminal manufacturers. Their principal product lines have included industry compliant hardware security modules, key management systems, key injection devices, and disaster recovery and load balancing systems.

The company’s current products include the SSP Series universal hardware security modules, SKI Series point-of-sale key management and clean room injection modules, and KMES Series key management and remote key loading solution.

References

External links
Futurex website

Cryptography companies